The Devils Rope Barbed Wire Museum is a museum located in McLean, Texas, United States. The museum was officially opened in 1991 and  focuses on barbed wire and its history. The museum is thought to have the largest collection of published material concerning barbed wire.

The Devil's Rope Museum is housed in a converted brassiere factory and is dedicated to the history of barbed wire, fencing tools, and ranching heritage. Features exhibits and collections from private wire collectors from across the U.S, a reference library with extensive patent information for researchers and educators, a dust bowl exhibit, salesman samples, warfare wire, and a collection of road lore with artifacts dedicated to the Texas portion of Historic Route 66.

References

External links 
 Devils Rope Barbed Wire Museum website

Museums established in 1991
Museums in Gray County, Texas
American West museums in Texas
1991 establishments in Texas